Harbison-Walker Refractories Company originated as the Star Firebrick Company on March 7, 1865, with Articles of Association by a group of Pittsburgh and Allegheny residents. On January 30, 1875, Hay Walker Sr. and Samuel P. Harbison entered Articles of Agreement to purchase the interests in Star Fire Brick Company and formed the Harbison and Walker Company. Then on July 30, 1894, Harbison & Walker was incorporated under the laws of the Commonwealth of Pennsylvania, finally being chartered as Harbison-Walker Refractories Company by the Commonwealth of Pennsylvania on June 30, 1902. Ultimately this company was merged into Dresser Industries in 1967.

The company was part of the Fortune 500 from 1955 until 1967.

In 2015 a successor company in Pittsburgh adopted the Harbison-Walker name and brand as its own.

A national historic district and historic refractory brick manufacturing complex located at Mount Union in Huntingdon County, Pennsylvania. It consists of 14 contributing buildings and 27 contributing structures.  They were built in two sections; the No. 2 works date to 1899 and the No. 1 works date to 1905.  Principal buildings and structures include brick kilns; mixing, molding, and drying facilities; storage and shipping sheds; a pattern making building; and crushing and screening facilities.

It was listed on the National Register of Historic Places in 1990.  It is located in the Mount Union Historic District, established in 1994.

References

External links
Official company website

Industrial buildings and structures on the National Register of Historic Places in Pennsylvania
Historic American Engineering Record in Pennsylvania
Historic districts on the National Register of Historic Places in Pennsylvania
Buildings and structures in Huntingdon County, Pennsylvania
National Register of Historic Places in Huntingdon County, Pennsylvania
1902 establishments in Pennsylvania
American companies established in 1902